The 1968 United States Senate election in Hawaii took place on November 5, 1968. Incumbent Democratic U.S. Senator Daniel Inouye was re-elected to a second term in office, easily defeating Republican nominee Wayne Thiessen.

Democratic primary

Candidates
 Daniel Inouye, incumbent Senator
 William Lampard
 Joseph Petrowski, candidate for Senate in 1962 and U.S. Representative in 1964

Results

General election

Results

See also 
 1968 United States Senate elections

References

1968
Hawaii
United States Senate
Daniel Inouye